Cicindela (Calomera) littoralis, commonly known as the littoral tiger beetle, is a species of Tiger Beetle found across the Palearctic realm, especially around the Mediterranean and Black seas. One of its subspecies, Calomera littoralis nemoralis, was the first member of the Cicindelidae family to exhibit vegetarian feeding behaviour, having been observed feeding on maize and cooked pasta in large numbers.

Notable subspecies

Cicindela (C.) littoralis nemoralis 
Cicindela littoralis nemoralis is common in Southern Europe.

References

Notes

Further reading 

 Identification, structural characterisation and expression analysis of a defensin gene from the tiger beetle Calomera littoralis

littoralis
Beetles described in 1787